Gavmish Cheran-e Arab (also Romanized as Gāvmīsh Cherān-e ‘Arab; also known as Gāvmīsh Cherān, Sheykh Dāvod ‘Arab, and Sheykh Dāvūd-e ‘Arab) is a village in Howmeh Rural District, in the Central District of Gilan-e Gharb County, Kermanshah Province, Iran. At the 2006 census, its population was 177, in 38 families.

References 

Populated places in Gilan-e Gharb County